Swing is the third extended play (EP) and fifth overall release by Mandopop boy band Super Junior-M, a sub-group of the South Korean band Super Junior. The EP consists of six songs, which were released for digital download on March 21, 2014, in China and Taiwan by S.M. Entertainment. The group released the album in Korean music sites, such as MelOn, genie, Naver music and more, on March 31, 2014.

This is the final album to feature Henry as a member before his departure on April 30, 2018.

Track list

Album sales

Release history

References

External links
 Super Junior-M – Official Korean website
 Super Junior-M – Official Chinese website
 Super Junior – Official YouTube Channel

Super Junior-M albums
2014 EPs
Mandopop EPs
SM Entertainment EPs
Genie Music EPs
Avex Taiwan albums